Ick or ICK may refer to:

 William Ick, (1800–1844), botanist
Ichthyophthirius multifiliis, a single-celled parasite. Also known as Ich
Inhibitor cystine knot
Institute of Christ the King Sovereign Priest
Intercity Kort, A Dutch train-coach
Intestinal cell (MAK-like) kinase, a human protein involved in organ development
 "Ick" is also an English slang term for something distasteful
 Ick, a character in the children's television show It's a Big Big World
 Islamic Community of Kosova, a religious organization in Kosovo

See also
IK (disambiguation)